"Spit It Out" is a song by American heavy metal band Slipknot, released as the second and final single from the band's 1999 self-titled debut album. The song is usually played last at concerts.

Background 
Originally, "Spit It Out" was recorded as the leading track in the 1998 demo of the band's self-titled album. They initially intended to re-record it for the final release, resulting in the faster "over-caffinated" remix, and the slower "Stamp You Out" remix. Unsatisfied with their later attempts, they decided that they "could not capture the magic of [the original] recording" and opted to use the original demo recording in the final release.

Style
Rick Anderson of AllMusic described the song as a "speed rap metal song".

Release and reception
There was a dispute over the release of this song as the band and album's first single. While deciding which track to release, guitarist Mick Thomson and percussionist Shawn Crahan were reportedly very enthusiastic about releasing "Surfacing" as the next single. "Spit It Out" was chosen to be released. The song reached number 28 in the UK Singles Chart. In 2020, Kerrang and Louder Sound both ranked the song number eight on their lists of the greatest Slipknot songs.

Music video
A music video was made for "Spit It Out" the video was directed by Thomas Mignone and consists of cuts between a live performance of the song and a band homage of the 1980 horror film The Shining, with Joey Jordison as Danny Torrance; Shawn Crahan and Chris Fehn as the Grady twins; Corey Taylor as Jack Torrance; Mick Thomson as Lloyd the Bartender; Paul Gray as Harry Derwent; Anthony Stevens as Roger; Craig Jones as Dick Hallorann; James Root as Wendy Torrance; and Sid Wilson as Lorraine Massey. The Shining sequences for the video were shot at the Villa Carlotta, in Hollywood, California, and were art directed by Chris Jordan and Robert Piser. This music video was banned from MTV, for various violent depictions, including Corey Taylor's smashing through a door with an axe (a spoof of the "Here's Johnny!" scene) and the scene wherein James Root viciously assaults Corey Taylor with a bat. A re-edited, less violent version was subsequently aired on MTV.  The song came out in MTV's return of the rock compilation.

As of February 2023, the music video for "Spit It Out" has over 72 million views on YouTube.

Track listing 

CD single / Japan promo CD single
"Spit It Out" – 2:41
"Surfacing"  – 3:46
"Wait and Bleed"  – 2:45
 Includes "Spit It Out" music video

7" single
"Spit It Out" – 2:41
"Surfacing"  – 3:46

EU promo CD single
"Spit It Out" – 2:39
 Includes "Spit It Out" music video

US promo CD single (1999)
"Spit It Out"  – 2:40
"Call-Out Hook" – 0:12

UK promo CD single
"Spit It Out"  – 2:41
"Surfacing"  – 3:46
"Wait and Bleed"  – 2:45

US promo CD single (2000) / Poland cassette single
"Spit It Out" – 2:41
"Surfacing"  – 3:46
"Wait and Bleed"  – 2:45

Japan promo cassette single
"Spit It Out"

Personnel

Slipknot 

(#8) Corey Taylor – vocals
(#7) Mick Thomson – guitar
(#6) Shawn Crahan – percussion
(#5) Craig Jones – samples, media
(#4) Josh Brainard – guitar
(#3) Greg Welts – percussion
(#2) Paul Gray – bass
(#1) Joey Jordison – drums, mixing
(#0) Sid Wilson – turntables

Production 
Sean McMahon – engineering, mixing
Steve Remote – engineering on "Surfacing" (live) and "Wait and Bleed" (live)
Jay Baumgardner – mixing on "Surfacing" (live) and "Wait and Bleed" (live)

Charts

References

1999 songs
2000 singles
Slipknot (band) songs
Songs written by Shawn Crahan
Songs written by Paul Gray (American musician)
Songs written by Joey Jordison
Roadrunner Records singles
American hip hop songs
Rap metal songs
Music video controversies